The Albizzi family was a Florentine family originally based in Arezzo, who were rivals of the Medici and Alberti families.  They were at the centre of Florentine oligarchy from 1382, in the reaction that followed the Ciompi revolt, to the rise of the Medici in 1434. They were active members of the Arte della Lana, Florence's wool guild. The Guilds played a central role in the  governance of the Republic of Florence during the medieval period and guild members constituted Florence's political and economic oligarchy.

The most famous and influential members of the family were Maso and his son Rinaldo degli Albizzi (1370–1442) who countered the rise of Cosimo de' Medici, exiling him in 1433. Luca, another son of Maso, was head of the Florentine galleys; his diary is an important source for historians. Luca was a loyal friend to Cosimo de' Medici. As a result, Luca was permitted to stay in Florence when the rest of his clan, including his brother, were exiled under the Medici regime in 1434. Moreover, in 1442, Luca Albizzi actually became the Gonfaloniere of Justice and stayed a key ally of Cosimo during this time.

Giovanna degli Albizzi was the wife of Lorenzo Tornabuoni. Both were prominent art patrons in Florence during the late 15th century. A portrait of Giovanna was painted in 1488.

The family palazzo in Borgo degli Albizzi was rebuilt with the return of the family in the early 16th century.

From 1565–1567, Eleonora degli Albizzi was a mistress of the Grand-Duke Cosimo I de Medici.

Filippo degli Albizzi was a Florentine naturalist from the 18th century on behalf of whom Albizia julibrissin was named.

Notes

 
Italian noble families
Families of Florence
Italian-language surnames